General Heliodoro Castillo is one of the 81 municipalities of Guerrero, in south-western Mexico, located 34 kilometres from Chilpancingo. The municipal seat lies at Tlacotepec.  This town is named after a prominent general. The municipality covers an area of 1,613.8 km².

As of 2005, the municipality had a total population of 34,554.

References

Municipalities of Guerrero